Agylla marcata is a moth of the family Erebidae. It was described by William Schaus in 1894. It is found in Rio de Janeiro, Brazil.

References

Moths described in 1894
marcata
Moths of South America